The 2009–10 Conference USA men's basketball season marks the 15th season of Conference USA basketball.

Preseason
In a vote of league coaches, Tulsa center Jerome Jordan headed up the preseason All-CUSA team and was named preseason conference player of the year.  On October 29, Jordan was named to the Naismith Award watch list.  Jordan's teammate Ben Uzoh was named to the 30-man preseason candidate list for the Lowe's Senior CLASS Award.

Preseason All-CUSA Team
Aubrey Coleman, Houston
Jerome Jordan, Tulsa
Kelvin Lewis, Houston
Arnett Moultrie, UTEP
Ben Uzoh, Tulsa

Preseason Player of the Year 
Jerome Jordan, Tulsa

Regular season

Postseason

Conference USA tournament

This season, the Conference USA men's basketball tournament started on March 10, 2010 and ended on March 13, 2010. The games were played in Tulsa, Oklahoma at the BOK Center, where 7th seeded Houston upset number 1 seeded UTEP in the championship game.

Conference awards & honors

Weekly awards
Conference USA Players of the week
Throughout the conference season, the Conference USA offices name a player and rookie of the week.

All-Conference Awards

Player of the Year: Randy Culpepper, UTEP
Freshman of the Year: Hassan Whiteside, Marshall
Defensive Player of the Year: Hassan Whiteside, Marshall
Sixth Man of the Year: Dago Pena, Marshall and Steven Idlet, Tulsa
Newcomer of the Year: Elliot Williams, Memphis
Coach of the Year: Tony Barbee, UTEP

Conference USA Men's Basketball All-Conference Teams
First Team
Aubrey Coleman, Houston
Randy Culpepper, UTEP
Elijah Millsap, UAB
Ben Uzoh, Tulsa
Elliot Williams, Memphis

Second Team
Derrick Caracter, UTEP
Gary Flowers, Southern Miss
Jerome Jordan, Tulsa
Hassan Whiteside, Marshall
Tyler Wilkerson, Marshall

Third Team
Papa Dia, SMU
Aaron Johnson, UAB
Derek Williams, SMU
Wesley Witherspoon, Memphis
Brock Young, East Carolina

Freshman Team
Keith Clanton, UCF
Marcus Jordan, UCF
Arsalan Kazemi, Rice
Kendall Timmons, Tulane
Hassan Whiteside, Marshall

Defensive Team
Aaron Johnson, UAB
Jerome Jordan, Tulsa
Julyan Stone, UTEP
Sai'Quon Stone, Southern Miss
Hassan Whiteside, Marshall

Academic Team
Connor Frizzelle, Rice
Lucas Kuipers, Rice
George Drake, UAB
Isaac Sosa, UCF
Isaac Gordon, UTEP

National awards & honors

National awards

NABC
District 11 Coach of the Year: Tony Barbee

USBWA
On March 9, the U.S. Basketball Writers Association released its 2009–10 Men's All-District Teams, based on voting from its national membership. There were nine regions from coast to coast and a player and coach of the year were selected in each. The following enumerates all the Conference USA representatives selected within their respective regions.

District IV (KY, TN MS, AL, GA, FL)
All-District Team
Elliot Williams, Memphis
District VI (IA, MO, KS, OK, NE, ND, SD)
All-District Team
None Selected
District VII (TX, AR, LA)
All-District Team
Randy Culpepper, UTEP

References